Anna Aleksandrovna Konanykhina (born 10 September 2004) is a Russian diver. In 2021, she won the gold medal in the women's 10 m platform event at the 2020 European Aquatics Championships held in Budapest, Hungary.

In May 2021, she also competed in the 2021 FINA Diving World Cup held in Tokyo, Japan. 

In August 2021, she competed in the women's 10 metre platform event at the 2020 Summer Olympics held in Tokyo, Japan.

References

External links 
 

Living people
2004 births
Divers from Saint Petersburg
Russian female divers
Divers at the 2020 Summer Olympics
Olympic divers of Russia
21st-century Russian women